Alexander Dotzler (born September 12, 1984) is a German professional ice hockey defenceman who is currently with the Dresdner Eislöwen of the DEL2. He has previously played in the Deutsche Eishockey Liga (DEL) for the Grizzlys Wolfsburg, Hamburg Freezers, Straubing Tigers and Iserlohn Roosters.

Career statistics

Regular season and playoffs

International

References

External links

1984 births
Living people
Dresdner Eislöwen players
Hamburg Freezers players
Iserlohn Roosters players
Straubing Tigers players
Grizzlys Wolfsburg players
German ice hockey defencemen
Sportspeople from Regensburg
EV Regensburg players
EV Landshut players
SC Bietigheim-Bissingen players